This list of notable people associated with Université libre de Bruxelles includes faculty, staff, graduates and former students in the undergraduate program and all graduate programs, and others affiliated with the University. Individuals are sorted by category and alphabetized within each category. The "Affiliation" fields in the tables in this list indicate the person's affiliation with the ULB and use the following notation:

 B indicates a bachelor's degree
 Att indicates that the person attended the undergraduate program but may not have graduated
 AM indicates a Master of Arts degree
 MSE indicates a Master of Science in Engineering degree awarded by the School of Engineering and Applied Science
 PhD indicates a Ph.D. degree
 GS indicates that the person was a graduate student but may not have received a degree
 F indicates a faculty member, followed by years denoting the time of service on the faculty
 Rec indicates a Rectors of Université libre de Bruxelles, followed by years denoting the time of service

Politics and government 
 Vũ Đức Đam (born 1963), politician, current Deputy Prime Minister of Vietnam.
 Aleth Félix-Tchicaya (born 1955), Congolese writer
 Fradique de Menezes (born 1942), President of São Tomé and Príncipe since 2001
 Charles Michel (born 1975), current Prime Minister of Belgium

Science and technology 
 Antonina Grégoire (1914-1952) Belgian business engineer, feminist,communist, Belgian Partisans Armés resistance member and politician.
 Delphine Lannuzel, PhD, 2006, sea ice biogeochemist and Antarctic researcher 
 André Sterling (born 1924), civil engineer and professor emeritus
Stephane de Baets (born 1969), founder of international asset management firm Elevated Returns and pioneer in blockchain-based real estate investing.
Marguerite Massart (1900-1979) first Belgian female engineer
Anne Goldberg, Belgian physicist, Research & Innovation Expert at Solvay

Nobel laureates

Faculty 
Eugene Goblet d'Alviella (1846–1925), historian and politician
Jules Bordet (1870–1961), physician, laureate of the 1919 Nobel Prize in Physiology or Medicine
Albert Claude (24 August 1899 – 22 May 1983), biologist, laureate of the 1974 Nobel Prize in Physiology or Medicine
Paul Hymans (1865–1941), law, first President of the League of Nations
Ilya Prigogine, (1917–2003), physicist and chemist, laureate of the 1955 Francqui Prize, and laureate of the 1977 Nobel Prize in Chemistry
Théophile de Donder, (1872–1957), physicist and mathematician, and father of irreversible thermodynamics
Jacques Tits (1930–2021), Belgian mathematician, laureate of the 1993 Wolf Prize and of the 2008 Abel Prize
Emile Vandervelde (1866–1938), statesman, professor of law and sociology
Éliane Vogel-Polsky (1926 – 2015) was a Belgian lawyer and feminist

See also
 Université libre de Bruxelles

References

External links
 Official website of Université libre de Bruxelles

Université libre de Bruxelles
Lists of people by university or college